Steven Henry Scheuer (January 9, 1926 – May 31, 2014) was a film and television historian and critic. He edited all seventeen editions of Movies on TV published between 1958 and 1993 and wrote The Movie Book (1974), subtitled A Comprehensive, Authoritative, Omnibus Volume on Motion Pictures and the Cinema World. He was moderator of the syndicated television series All About TV from 1969 to 1990. In 2002, he hosted and produced a 13-program series for public television, Television in America: An Autobiography.

Life
Scheuer was born in New York City in 1926. His brothers (all deceased) were 13-term New York Congressman James H. Scheuer, Walter Scheuer, an investor and film producer, and Richard Scheuer, a scholar and philanthropist. He also had a sister, Amy Scheuer Cohen. His wife was author and feminist social critic Alida Brill.

Scheuer died on May 31, 2014, in New York of congestive heart failure.

The Movies on TV series
Movies on TV was the first guide of its kind, preceding Leonard Maltin's similarly titled TV Movies book series (later rebranded Leonard Maltin's Movie Guide) by ten years. It contained capsule reviews and ratings of movies, videos and TV movies using a four star rating system. It was renamed Movies on TV and Videocassette in 1989. Scheuer's book differed from Maltin's in that it featured a greater number of made-for-television productions, including aired television pilots that Maltin's book omitted.

Selected works
 Movies on TV (17 editions, 1958–1993)
 The Movie Book (1974).  
 The Television Annual 1978-79 (1979). 
 Movie Blockbusters (ghostwritten by Jim Beaver (1982, revised 1983)
 Who's Who in Television and Cable (1983). 
 Box Office Champions: The Biggest Movie Blockbusters of All Time (1984)
 The Complete Guide to Videocassette Movies (1987). 
 The Pocket Guide to Collecting Movies on DVD (2003) (by Steven Scheuer and Alida Brill-Scheuer).

External links (archival material)
 Steven H. Scheuer Collection of Television Program Scripts, Yale University, "contains approximately five thousand American television scripts dating from about 1953 to 1963." 
 Steven H. Scheuer Papers, Syracuse University Library Special Collections Research Center
 Steven H. Scheuer Television History Interviews, Syracuse University Library Special Collections Research Center

References

1926 births
American film critics
American people of German-Jewish descent
20th-century American Jews
2014 deaths
21st-century American Jews